There are two species named Lowland red forest rat.

 Western nesomys
 White-bellied nesomys

Animal common name disambiguation pages